Ore Vaanam Ore Bhoomi is a 1979 Indian Tamil-language film directed by I. V. Sasi, starring Jaishankar, K. R. Vijaya and Seema. It was released on 22 June 1979. The film was remade in Malayalam as Ezhamkadalinakkare the same year by the same director.

Plot

Cast 
Jaishankar as Shankar
K. R. Vijaya as Lakshmi
Ravikumar as Somu
Seema as Seetha
Vidhubala as Latha
V. K. Ramasamy
Manorama

Production
Ore Vaanam Ore Bhoomi was said to be the first Tamil film to be shot in the United States while also shot at Canada and New York. Padmini made her acting comeback with this film. The filming was held at locations like Niagara falls and Kennedy airport.

Soundtrack 
The music was composed by M. S. Viswanathan, with lyrics by Kannadasan.

Reception
Kutty Krishnan of Kalki wrote neither the sky nor the earth it is a hanging space between the two.

References

External links 
 

1970s Tamil-language films
1979 films
Films directed by I. V. Sasi
Films scored by M. S. Viswanathan
Films set in hospitals
Films set in Manhattan
Films set in Ontario
Films shot in New York City
Films shot in Ontario
Indian films set in New York City
Tamil films remade in other languages